County routes in Rensselaer County, New York, are maintained by the Rensselaer County Highway Department and signed with the Manual on Uniform Traffic Control Devices-standard yellow-on-blue pentagon route marker. Routes generally do not enter cities or incorporated villages, except for CRs 117 & 118 in Valley Falls. County route numbers are assigned in clusters by town, with the number indicating the town that most of the route lies within:
1–9: Schodack
15–21: Nassau
23–33: Stephentown
36–42: Berlin
43–44: Poestenkill
45–53: Sand Lake
54–63: East Greenbush
65–76: North Greenbush
79–88: Grafton
90–98: Petersburgh
100–105: Hoosick
109–115, 117–118 and 123: Pittstown
116, 119–122 and 124–127: Schaghticoke
128–145: Brunswick

Each route entry below contains a link to its relation in OpenStreetMap (OSM).

Routes 1–53

Routes 54–105

Routes 109–145

See also

County routes in New York
List of former state routes in New York (301–400)

Notes

References

External links
Empire State Roads – Rensselaer County Roads
Errata for Empire State Roads
OpenStreetMap – Rensselaer County Route Relations
Rensselaer County Highway Department home page